The Real Deal is an album by the American musician Edgar Winter, released in 1996. Winter supported the album with a North American tour that included shows with Hank Williams Jr.

Production
Jermaine Jackson, Leon Russell, Jeff "Skunk" Baxter, Rick Derringer, and Ronnie Montrose were among the musicians who contributed to the album. Aside from Jackson, Winter had played with all of the musicians before. Winter's brother, Johnny, also played on the album.

Critical reception

The Sun-Sentinel wrote that "Winter displays more chops as an arranger than as a songwriter, his able combos doing slick renditions of mostly pat, wedding-band tunes."

AllMusic called it "one of Winter's best albums in quite some time." MusicHound Rock: The Essential Album Guide noted that "flawless playing can't overcome the sterile recording ... which is as clinical as a jingle house."

Track listing

References

Edgar Winter albums
1996 albums